Upper Lonsdale is a suburban area in both the City and District of North Vancouver. This area runs north of Highway 1 (around 24th Street) to the corner of Lonsdale and Rockland (where Lonsdale Avenue comes to an end). The first 5 blocks up Lonsdale Avenue (from 25th Street to 29th Street) are part of the City of North Vancouver, while the remaining blocks (29th Street to Rockland) belong to the District of North Vancouver. Upper Lonsdale is the more residential part of Lonsdale Avenue, although it does have a couple of blocks of shops and services (all of which run from 29th Street up to Kings Road—only two blocks). The peak of Lonsdale Avenue (where it meets Rockland) sits at an elevation of 850 feet above sea level whereas Lower Lonsdale (a mere 5 minute drive south) sits at sea level at some points).
The bus line 230 to Upper Lonsdale and Lonsdale Quay serves the area all the way up to the end of Lonsdale Avenue, before going down Rockland Street. See Arthur Heywood-Lonsdale for the origins of the name Lonsdale.

References

North Vancouver (city)
North Vancouver (district municipality)